The 2021 Frankfurt Galaxy season was the first season of the new Frankfurt Galaxy team in the inaugural season of the European League of Football. After losing the season opener to the Hamburg Sea Devils on a last second Phillip Friis Andersen Field Goal, the team proceeded to win all remaining games, to win their ELF South Division, beating the Cologne Centurions in the playoffs and ultimately winning the inaugural Championship Game at Merkur Spiel-Arena, Düsseldorf against the Hamburg Sea Devils on September 26, 2021.

Regular season

Standings

Schedule

Source: europeanleague.football

Playoffs

Divisional playoffs

South: Frankfurt Galaxy 36, Cologne Centurions 3

North: Hamburg Sea Devils 30, Wrocław Panthers 27

Championship Game

The inaugural Championship Game, between the North and South division champions, was played on September 26, at Merkur Spiel-Arena in Düsseldorf. In a game in which the lead changed more than once, the impact of the kicking game could be felt, as Frankfurt, not confident enough of the quality of their placekicker, opted for two point conversions after every single Touchdown (only one out of five being successful) and not attempting a single Field Goal. Meanwhile Phillip Friis Andersen who had made 17 out of 18 attempts during the regular season (league best) and made every single Point after Touchdown attempt during the game missed a field goal attempt from 38 yards while the score was 30-26 in favor of Hamburg and another from 61 yards on the last play of the game for Hamburg.

Roster

Notes

References 

Frankfurt Galaxy (ELF)
Frankfurt Galaxy
Frankfurt Galaxy